Jeannie Wall (born June 6, 1969) from Bozeman, Montana is an American ski mountaineer and member of the United States Ski Mountaineering Association (USSMA) ski team.

Wall is the youngest of eleven children. She was the first female to cross the finish line in the 32-mile American Birkebeiner Nordic ski race, in Cable, Wisconsin, in 2002, as well as the top American female on the North American Randonnee Rally circuit. She was also USA Team Manager at the 2006 World Championship.

Selected results 
 2003:
 1st, North American Randonnée Championships, Jackson Hole
 1st, Wasatch PowderKeg, Alta
 2004:
 5th, World Championship vertical race
 1st, Open Internacional, San Carlos de Bariloche
 2005:
 4th, Pierra Menta (together with Emma Roca Rodríguez)
 2006:
 1st, America's Cup

External links 
 Jeannie Wall at skimountaineers.org
 Photo

References 

1969 births
Living people
American female ski mountaineers
21st-century American women